Unexplained Mysteries is an American documentary television series that originally aired in syndication from 2003 to 2004 for a single season. The show deals with eyewitness accounts of paranormal activity, especially aliens, UFOs, and ghosts; almost all of them are rehashed reports from the series Sightings and Paranormal Borderline.

Episode guide

External links

Unexplained Mysteries at The Sightings Information Page

CTV Sci-Fi Channel original programming
Television series by CBS Studios
Paranormal television
2000s American documentary television series
2003 American television series debuts
2004 American television series endings
First-run syndicated television programs in the United States
UFO-related television